Workers' Party of Finland is a left-wing political party in Finland. The STP was founded in 2006 as a successor to the Alternative League (1999–2006).

In the 2007 parliamentary election the party obtained 1,764 votes.

The Workers Party of Finland was formed in Helsinki 17 September 2006. Four of the six elected party leaders were activists of the League of Communists, a 2002 split of the Communist Workers' Party. Juhani Tanski was elected president of the STP.

The party has a bimonthly newspaper Kansan ääni, which is shared between the organizations League of Communists, People's Front Against European Union (EUVKr), and Work Against War and Fascism (SFT).

Elections

See also
List of Communist Party (Finland) breakaway parties

References

External links
 

 
2006 establishments in Finland
Political parties established in 2006